The Connecticut Department of Transportation (CTDOT) maintains a system of state highways to serve the predominant flow of traffic between towns within Connecticut, and to towns in surrounding states. State highways also include roads that provide access to federal and state facilities (Special Service Roads).

The state highway system consists of roads indicated on the official CTDOT map and highway log. All state highways are state-maintained except for several segments (totaling 4 miles) that are locally maintained. Interstate highways and U.S. highways in the state are not Connecticut state routes, however they are maintained by the state.

All state highways are given a number designation. All state highways are assigned Route numbers. Route numbers are in the 2–999 range. State highways that are special service roads are assigned SSR numbers and are unsigned; these numbers are above 399 and are used for internal CTDOT purposes.  Signposted state highways that are not U.S. highways or interstates are signed with the square Connecticut state highway shield.

State Routes
Routes are signed state highways and are assigned numbers from 1 to 399 (with the exception of I-684 and I-691). All state, U.S. and Interstate highways are part of the same numbering system. In 1926, the U.S. highway system was implemented. U.S. Routes 1, 5, 6, and 7 were used as designations on several primary state highways, replacing New England routes 1, 2, 3, and 4, respectively. The other New England routes that were not re-designated as U.S. routes became ordinary state highways but kept their number designation, which are used even today (with some realignment). In 1958, Connecticut received approval for the route numbers of its three primary Interstate highways: I-84, I-91, and I-95. State highways with the same number designation as the Interstate highways were renumbered to avoid duplication of route numbers.

Special Service Roads

Roads classified by the Department of Transportation as special service roads are given an unsigned number designation between 400 and 499. Special service roads are roads that connect a federal or state facility (including state parks and some Interstate Highway interchanges) to a signed state route.  These numbers only appear in internal documentation, none of them are signed.

State Roads

State Roads are state-maintained roads that are usually long entrance/exit ramps to/from an expressway, or short interconnecting roads between signed routes. Roads classified by the Department of Transportation as state roads are given an unsigned number designation between 500 and 999. The first digit denotes which Maintenance District the road is mainly located in:
500–599: District 1: Greater Hartford
600–699: District 2: Quiet Corner, Lower Connecticut River Valley, Southeastern Connecticut
700–799: District 3: Southwestern Connecticut, Greater New Haven
800–899: District 4: Naugatuck River Valley, Greater Danbury, Northwestern Connecticut
900–999: Statewide; very short routes

State road numbers are only for internal record-keeping and documentation, all of these roads are unsigned.

History

1913 trunk line system 

In 1900, the State Highway Department proposed a statewide system of trunk line routes. By 1913, the system consisted of 10 north-south highways and 4 east-west highways, including the lower Boston Post Road. The 14 trunk lines were numbered on paper but were never actually signposted. The 14 trunk line routes were:
 Route 1: east-west from Greenwich to Stonington, roughly modern U.S. Route 1
 Route 2: north-south from Stamford to Salisbury, roughly modern Route 106, Route 33, Route 35, U.S. Route 7, Route 341, Route 41
 Route 3: north-south from Norwalk to North Canaan, roughly modern U.S. Route 7, Route 107, Route 53, Route 37, U.S. Route 202, Route 45, U.S. Route 7
 Route 4: north-south from Bridgeport to Colebrook, roughly modern Route 8
 Route 5: north-south from New Haven to Suffield via Cheshire (concurrent with Route 6 north of Hartford), roughly modern Route 10, Route 4, Route 159
 Route 6: north-south from New Haven to Suffield via Meriden (concurrent with Route 5 north of Hartford), roughly modern U.S. Route 5, Route 71, Route 159
 Route 7: north-south from New Haven to Enfield via Middletown, roughly modern Route 17, Route 99, U.S. Route 5
 Route 8: north-south from Old Saybrook to Hartford, roughly modern Route 9, Route 99
 Route 9: north-south from New London to Colebrook, roughly modern Route 85, Route 2, Route 189, Route 20
 Route 10: north-south from New London to Thompson, roughly modern Route 32, Route 169, Route 12, Route 193
 Route 11: north-south from Stonington to Woodstock, roughly modern Route 2, Route 32, U.S. Route 6, Route 198
 Route 12: east-west from Salisbury to Putnam, roughly Twin Lakes Road, modern U.S. Route 44
 Route 13: east-west from Kent to Sterling, roughly modern Route 341, U.S. Route 202, Route 118, Route 4, U.S. Route 6, Route 14
 Route 14: east-west from Sherman to Killingly, roughly Route 37, Route 67, Route 317, Route 64, Route 322, Route 66, U.S. Route 6

New England road marking system
The first public route numbering came with the advent of the New England road marking system of 1922. This highway numbering system was used throughout New England and consisted of 25 routes (with route numbers from 1 to 32). A total of 9 of the routes passed through Connecticut (Routes 1, 2, 3, 4, 8, 10, 12, 17, and 32). In this system, inter-state routes would be numbered 1–99 and state routes numbered 100 and up. The New England route system was soon eclipsed by the national U.S. highway system.

1922–1931 
The State Highway Department classified state roads as either State Highways (SH) or State Aid Roads (SA). These roads were given number designations – 100–299 for primary routes and 300+ for secondary routes. Some state roads were signposted and some were not.

1932 renumbering 

The state abandoned its old numbering system and renumbered almost all of their state highways in 1932. Most of the present route numbers were formed during this renumbering. The only route numbers that survived were U.S. Routes and a few state highway routes. For route numbers established in 1932, the new numbering system used odd numbers for north-south routes and even numbers for east-west routes, matching the U.S. Highway numbering system. The New England routes that were grandfathered into the highway system (Routes 8, 10, 12, 32) did not follow the new system. The state also assigned new route numbers in clusters, with routes in the same general location having numbers close to each other as well. Shortly after the renumbering, in 1935, two new U.S. Routes were commissioned: US 44 (taking over part of old New England Route 17) and US 202.

1963 renumbering 
In 1963, the state passed the Road Reclassification Act to fix the by now fragmented state highway system. Many state highways had state maintenance gaps and several highway segments were even isolated from the rest of the system. State highways were classified into primary, secondary, and service roads. Primary routes were essentially left unchanged, while minor realignments, additions/deletions, and extensions occurred in many secondary routes. About 1/3 of all routes were changed to some degree by this renumbering. The current system of unsigned ("secret") routes, including the special service roads, was also created during this renumbering. The state highway system has not had any major changes since then. The state completely abandoned the odd/even numbering scheme established in 1932 with new numbers in 1963 assigned without regard to their direction or general location.

See also

 List of crossings of the Connecticut River
 New England Interstate Routes
 Numbered highways in the United States

References

External links

 Connecticut State Numbered Routes and Roads as of December 31, 2004 (PDF)
 Official State Highway Map (PDF – 5 MB)
 Routes Page by Kurumi
 CT State Highway Endpoint Photos
 Connecticut US and State Route Listing (Greater New York Roads)

State Routes
State Routes